Ivan Pavlovich Mashkov (13 January 1867 – 1945) was a Russian  architect and preservationist, notable for surveying and restoration of Dormition Cathedral of Moscow Kremlin, Novodevichy Convent and other medieval buildings. His best known extant building is Sokol (Falcon) luxury Art Nouveau apartment building in Kuznetsky Most Street, Moscow. A prolific architect, Mashkov built mostly eclectic buildings with Russian Revival features.

Biography

Education and early career

Ivan Mikhailovich Sokolov (Иван Михайлович Евдокимов), son of a village blacksmith, lost both his parents in early childhood. He was adopted by Pavel Karpovich Mashkov, a Lipetsk businessman, and his wife, Natalya Yefimovna (née Andreyeva), thus acquiring the name of Mashkov. Natalya's brother, Alexey Yefimovich Andreev, was a town architect in Lipetsk. 

In 1881, Ivan was admitted to Moscow School of Painting, Sculpture and Architecture. He graduated Alexander Kaminsky class of architecture with an honorary medal and a construction license in 1886 at the age of 19 – an exceptionally quick education by any standard (normally, it would take 10 to 15 years from admissions to professional license). 

In 1889–1890 he visited Lipetsk and completed there two schools, a hospital and a prison chapel – at the age of 23. Back in Moscow, Mashkov completed over a dozen buildings still in his twenties, and his masterpiece – the Sokol – at the age of 36.

Sokol Building

Mashkov's Sokol (Falcon) building is unique not only for his career, but to Moscow Art Nouveau in general. It is the only building in the city designed in original Vienna Secession style (see Illarion Ivanov-Schitz for a modified version of Secession). Its gilded roof and abundant forged iron ornaments looked like a citation from Otto Wagner (these ornaments were eventually lost). At the same time, the building is definitely Muscovite; the shape of its frieze repeats the lines of nearby Hotel Metropol. 

The majolica mosaic of a falcon flying over a stormy sea was made by Nikolai Sapunov (of Mir Iskusstva art group). The subject of this picture itself is a double citation – from Maxim Gorky's Song of a falcon (1899) and from nearby Moscow Art Theater's Seagull symbol (1903). However, the building has nothing to do with these symbols or with Mashkov's natural name – it was named after M.V. Sokol, the owner.

Neoclassical revival

Mashkov's work prior to Sokol belongs to traditional muscovite eclectics and moderate Russian Revival of 1880s-1890s, and does not stand out among hundreds of similar buildings of this period. An unusually large share of his work was built for public charities, which ruled out expensive decorations and interiors. The only decoration he allowed was Abramtsevo majolica.

After the Russian Revolution of 1905, the public lost the interest in Art Nouveau; architects responded with a revival of Neoclassicism. Mashkov completed two private buildings (Tverskoy Pawn Shop and Eggert Apartments) in a stern, Saint Petersburg version of this style. In 1912-1913, he built his last major project - psychiatric hospital in Poteshnaya Street (now, Gannushkin Hospital). These buildings didn't make architectural landmarks; Mashkov, however, did make a lasting statement with his iconic monument to Ivan Fydorov (sculpture by Sergei Volnukhin).

Preservation and public activities

He surveyed many historical churches and monasteries in Moscow, Dmitrov, Borovsk etc., published his own studies and edited the journal of Society. Mashkov supervised restoration of Kremlin cathedrals, Sukharev Tower, St. Basil Cathedral and other memorial buildings. In 1908-1918, he also co-chaired Moscow Architectural Society and contributed to the construction of House of Architects (17, Yermolayevsky Lane, currently Museum of Modern Art). In 1908-1933, he managed the Architectural Department of Polytechnical Museum, the forerunner of present-day Museum of Architecture. He is credited with editing the best guide to architecture of Moscow (1913). 

Despite his reputation as preservationist and archaeologist, Mashkov joined the emerging skyscraper movement in 1913, and proposed a 13-story highrise on Tverskaya Street. The City Hall blocked this proposal and banned further highrise construction in the center of Moscow.

Soviet period

At the time of Russian Revolution of 1917, Mashkov was employed by the City of Moscow as deputy to City Architect. Bolshevik administration retained him in his office, and for some time Mashkov acted as the City Architect, engaged mostly in maintenance of the city in the middle of a civil war. 

In 1929, Mashkov and sculptor Nikolay Andreyev erected the neoclassical monument to Aleksandr Ostrovsky near Maly Theater. Mashkov continued surveying memorial buildings (some of them already scheduled for demolition) and headed the restoration of Pashkov House (then known as Rumyantsev Museum, later Lenin Library and Russian State Library). He took no part in architectural disputes of 1920s, but was present in professional journals and wrote college textbooks (1935).

In 1934, Mashkov became a professor in Moscow Architectural Institute; since 1935 he chaired the department of architecture of Moscow Construction Institute. In 1937, he was awarded the title of Hero of Labor (1927 statute, predecessor of 1938 Hero of Socialist Labor title). Mashkov remained well established in Soviet academic circles until his death and was buried with honors at Novodevichy Cemetery; his book on Novodevichy Convent was reissued posthumously in 1949.

Buildings

Own design (extant buildings and monuments)

 1890-1891 Rebuilding of Suchkova Estate, 15/28 Bolshoy Levshinsky Lane (now, UNESCO mission)
 1899-1902 Public housing and almshouses, 6 and 10, Gospitalnaya Square
 1899-1903 Public housing and almshouse, 19 Protopopovsky Lane
 1900-1902 Mental asylum and almshouse, 16 Leningradsky Prospect
 1902 - 3, Lopukhinsky Lane
 1903 - 13, Mansurovsky Lane
 1902-1904 - Cathedral of Trinity and St. Alexander Nevsky Convent in Akatovo, Klin district (demolished in part)
 1903-1904 - Sokol Apartment Building, 3 Kuznetsky Most Street
 1904 - Novodevichy Cemetery wall
 1904 - 8, Second Boyevskaya Street
 1904 - 60/2, Bolshaya Polyanka Street
 1904-1907 - Polytechnical Museum expansion (Left Wing, Auditorium)
 1905-1906 - 21, Leontyevsky Lane
 1909 - monument to Ivan Fyodorov
 1910 - School, 28 Vyatskaya Street
 1912 - Tverskoy Pawn Shop, 23 Bolshaya Bronnaya Street
 1912-1913 Gannushkin Psychiatric Hospital
 1914 - Eggert Apartments, 4, Rossolimo Street
 1929 - monument to Aleksandr Ostrovsky

Restoration

1899 - Church of St. George "v Pushkariakh", Moscow (demolished 1935)
1905-1945 - Smolensky Cathedral of Novodevichy Convent
1890s - Pafnutiev Monastery in Borovsk
1890s - Cathedral in Borisoglebsky Monastery, Dmitrov
1908 - Zyuzino church in Moscow photo
1911-1915 - Cathedral of the Dormition in Moscow Kremlin
1925-1927 - Pashkov House of Russian State Library

References
 Russian: Нащокина М. В. Архитекторы московского модерна М., Жираф, 2005,   (Maria Naschokina. All dates are referenced to pp. 330–338 of this edition)
 Russian: Нащокина М. В. Московский модерн. М., изд. Жираф, 2005 
 Russian: Brandenburg and Tatarzhinskaya, "Serving the Russian Art" illustrated bio
 Russian: Sokol Building, phorographs, floorplan 
 Russian: History of UNESCO headquarters in Moscow 
 Russian: Genealogy of Mashkovs by Tatiana Shakhbazova 
 Russian: Zyuzino Estate, official site of South-Western Okrug 

1867 births
1945 deaths
People from Lipetsk Oblast
People from Lebedyansky Uyezd
Academic staff of Moscow Architectural Institute
Art Nouveau architects
Russian neoclassical architects
Burials at Novodevichy Cemetery
Moscow School of Painting, Sculpture and Architecture alumni